The Heinz-Steyer-Stadion, in Dresden, Germany, is an association football, American football and athletics stadium currently used by the Dresdner SC and the Dresden Monarchs. It has a capacity of about 30,000 but is currently restricted to about 5,000 for football matches (although it had attendances of more than 50,000 people in the 1930s). It was also the first stadium of Dynamo Dresden. It was the venue for Dynamo's first Inter-Cities Fairs Cup match, against Rangers.

Clubs that use the stadium 
Dresden Monarchs (American football), playing in the German Football League
Dresdner SC (football and athletics)
Dresden Cavaliers  (American football) in FFL

International Association football matches

International American football matches

National teams
The 2015 edition of the European Junior Championship of American football had its "final four" round held at Heinz Steyer Stadion.

Club teams
While the Dresden Monarchs usually move to the larger Rudolf Harbig Stadion for home games involving international opposition, they occasionally host foreign visitors in Heinz Steyer Stadion as well.

References

External links 

 Photo gallery and data at Erlebnis-stadion.de

Football venues in East Germany
Football venues in Germany
Buildings and structures in Dresden
Dresdner SC
Athletics (track and field) venues in Germany
History of sport in East Germany
American football venues in Germany
Sports venues completed in 1919
Sports venues in Saxony
1919 establishments in Germany